Yashesh Acharya (born September 29, 1984) is an Indian film director, Author and Screenwriter. He is best known for his first film which created a world record by becoming the first film in the world to be released in the Metaverse. The film is titled "A Star Has Fallen".

He published his firs novel titled "The World In The Mirror" in the year 2020 and Second novel titled "The Possession of Amyra" in the year 2022.

References

1984 births
Living people